Holy Rosary Parish may refer to:

Holy Rosary Parish, Angeles
Holy Rosary Parish, Hadley
Holy Rosary Parish Billingham
Holy Rosary parish, Warispura

See also
Holy Rosary Church (disambiguation)